45th Street may refer to:

45 Street station (Calgary), a light rail station in Calgary, Alberta, Canada
45th Street station (BMT Fourth Avenue Line), New York City, New York
45th Street station (Hudson–Bergen Light Rail), Bayonne, New Jersey
45th Street station (Tri-Rail), proposed station in West Palm Beach, Florida